CYTB may refer to:

MT-CYB, a gene
the ICAO code for Tillsonburg Airport in Ontario, Canada